Svenn Crone (born 20 May 1995) is a Danish professional footballer who plays as a right-back for Norwegian First Division club Brann.

Born in Rødovre, Crone progressed through the Brøndby IF youth academy before being promoted to the first team in July 2014. After a loan to Brønshøj Boldklub, he began making an impact for Brøndby under head coach Alexander Zorniger as a left-back. In 2018, he signed with Silkeborg IF where he grew out to become team captain, before moving to Lyngby Boldklub in January 2021.

Besides his club career, Crone has represented Denmark at youth levels between U16 and U20.

Career

Brøndby
Crone signed a three-year extension to his contract on 18 September 2013 which ties him to Brøndby until the summer 2017 and secured him a slot in the first team from the summer 2014. Crone was, despite his status as U19 player, brought into the first-team squad during the winter training camp during January 2014 in the United Arab Emirates. He made his first unofficial first-team appearance during that training camp, in the 73rd minute of a friendly against defending Ukrainian champions Shakhtar Donetsk in Abu Dhabi, where he came on as a right-back.

Crone was eventually officially included in the first-team squad on 1 July 2014. He made his official debut for Brøndby in a Danish Cup match against Fremad Amager on 29 October 2014, and on 27 November he signed a contract extension, keeping him at the club until the summer of 2017. Appearances were, however, few and far between, and on 2 February 2015, the last day of the transfer window, Crone was sent on a six-month loan to Brønshøj Boldklub in the second-tier 1st Division.

Crone made his first European appearance after returning to Brøndby from his loan, coming on as a late second-half substitute for Lebogang Phiri in a 0–2 away win over Sammarinese club Juvenes/Dogana in the first qualifying round of the 2015–16 UEFA Europa League. He made his debut in the Danish Superliga for Brøndby on 13 March 2016, when he came on as a substitute in the 46th minute instead of Martin Ørnskov in a 1–0 win at home over Randers FC. He subsequently played the following three successive matches in the Superliga as a substitute, and in the second last matchday of the season he made his first start and played the entire match against Hobro IK.

Under new head coach Alexander Zorniger, who arrived prior to the 2016–17 season, Crone made an impact as a left-back after Riza Durmisi had moved Real Betis. However, after the signing of Anthony Jung, Crone was benched. He made 62 total appearances for Brøndby, in which he scored one goal.

Silkeborg
On 25 June 2018, Crone signed a three-year contract with Silkeborg IF in the 1st Division. He was appointed team captain in summer 2020. In October 2020, he tested positive for COVID-19 alongside fellow Silkeborg players Jeppe Gertsen and Pelle Mattsson.

Lyngby
On transfer deadline day, 1 February 2021, Crone joined Lyngby Boldklub on a deal until the June 2023. He made his debut for the club on 7 February in a 1–0 away loss to AGF, coming on as a substitute in the 63rd minute for Kasper Jørgensen. He suffered relegation to the Danish 1st Division with the club on 9 May 2021 after a loss to last placed AC Horsens.

Brann
On 27 February 2022, Crone signed for Norwegian First Division club Brann on a deal until the end of 2024. He made his debut for the club on 12 March, starting at right back in a fourth round Norwegian Football Cup defeat to KFUM-Kameratene Oslo. His first league appearance followed on the first matchday of the season, on 3 April, in a 4–0 away victory against Ranheim.

Career statistics

Honours
Brøndby
Danish Cup: 2017–18

References

External links

1995 births
Living people
People from Rødovre
Danish men's footballers
Association football fullbacks
Denmark youth international footballers
Danish Superliga players
Brøndby IF players
Brønshøj Boldklub players
Silkeborg IF players
Lyngby Boldklub players
Danish 1st Division players
Eliteserien players
SK Brann players
Danish expatriate sportspeople in Norway
Expatriate footballers in Norway
Sportspeople from the Capital Region of Denmark